Agafia Svyatoslavna of Rus (between 1190 and 1195 – after 31 August 1247/2 June 1248) was Princess of Masovia by her marriage and was a member of the Rurikid dynasty.

Life
Agafia was the daughter of Svyatoslav III Igorevich and his wife Yaroslava Rurikovna, a daughter of prince Rurik Rostislavich of Belgorod.

Between 1207 and 1210, Agafia arrived in Poland to marry Konrad I of Masovia. The marriage was for political reasons, as her father had become an ally of Leszek I the White and wanted to improve relations with the Polish nobility. Agafia and Konrad were married for at least thirty years.

Agafia was very supportive of bringing about the draft of the Teutonic Order. These efforts were successful and in 1227 the couple were greeted by Herman Balka, who brought the first knights. In 1239 there was a crime that involved Agafia's family. It started when their son Casimir married Constance, daughter of Henry II the Pious. John Heron, who had been good to the family and had educated Agafia and Konrad's sons, had shown disobedience towards Casimir after his marriage to Constance, John probably also disapproved over Konrad's rule in Plock. John was found guilty and put to death. He was tortured and then had a public hanging. Jan Długosz wrote: "And when he died his body was removed from the gallows and several brothers of a Dominican took him away to be buried. Since Agafia was involved in the conviction, she is now considered so blood thirsty, she became known as the second Jezebel. John was not buried, Agafia and Konrad had him hung in the Cathedral of Plock. The couple were also said to be cursed by Archbishop of Gniezno.

The news of the murder spread rapidly across the country. Archbishop Pelka placed a curse on Conrad and Agafia and laid an interdict on Masovia. The church bells were silent over Masovia and the citizens did not go to celebrate mass; there were also no funerals or weddings. Conrad was now running out of friends and had lost the faith of his subjects. Conrad went to Lowicz Gniezno Cathedral and obtained forgiveness for himself and Agafia.

There is a plate displayed in Plock, which has Agafia, her husband and eldest two sons on it.

Agafia's exact date of death is unknown. It is known that she outlived Konrad, who died 31 August 1247.

It is believed that Agafia was buried at the Cathedral of Plock.

Children
Agafia and Konrad had the following children:
Boleslaw I of Masovia (c. 1210–17 April 1248), Duke of Mazovia (1247–1248)
Casimir I of Kuyavia (born between 1210 and 1213 – died 14 Dec 1267) Prince of Kuyavia (1247–1267)
Siemowit I of Masovia (c. 1213–24 June 1262), succeeded eldest brother as Duke of Mazovia (1248–1262)
Eudoxia (1215–1240) – The wife of Count Breny I of Wettin
Ludmila (born before 1225)
Ziemomysł (born between 1216 and 4 Jul 1228 Died between 10 July and 18 September 1241)
Salomea (born between 1220 and 1225 died after 30 August 1268), nun
Judith (born between 1222 and 1227Died. 4 Dec between 1257 and 1263) – married firstly to Mieszko II the Fat. Secondly to Henry III the White
Dubrawka (c. 1230–1265)
Mieszko (b. 1235), died in infancy.

References

Sources

1190s births
1247 deaths
12th-century Rus' women
13th-century Rus' women
12th-century Rus' people
13th-century Rus' people
Piast dynasty
Olgovichi family
Polish queens consort
12th-century Polish people
12th-century Polish women
13th-century Polish people
13th-century Polish women